Hoàn Kiếm (Sino-Vietnamese name meaning Returned Sword) is one of the four original urban districts of Hanoi, the capital city of Vietnam. It is named after the scenic Hoàn Kiếm Lake. The lake is in the heart of the district and serves as the focal point of the city's public life. The majority of tourist attractions in Hanoi are also located in the district.

The district currently has 18 wards, covering a total area of 5.29 square kilometers. As of 2019, there were 135,618 people residing in the district

Hoàn Kiếm is the downtown and commercial center of Hanoi. Most of the largest Vietnamese public corporations and bank headquarters are located here, but the central government offices are located in Ba Đình district. The Hanoi City Committee is located on Đinh Tiên Hoàng street, adjacent to the Hoàn Kiếm lake.

The district has a north–south division among its wards. Its northern half houses the Old Quarter with small street blocks and alleys, and a traditional Vietnamese atmosphere. The southern half has distinctive French-style villas and broad avenues, and is sometimes called the "French Quarter" in modern travel literature. Some notable buildings in Hoàn Kiếm's "French Quarter" are the Hanoi Opera House, the Sofitel Legend Metropole Hanoi hotel, the National Museum of Vietnamese History (formerly the École française d'Extrême-Orient), the Grand Palais, and the Tonkin Palace.

History
The district has been witness to the long history of Hanoi.

In the early Lý dynasty, in 545, the emperor Lý Nam Đế settled his encampment, and built a wooden raft on the Tô Lịch River to defend against invasion of the Liang dynasty.

During the Nguyễn dynasty, Emperor Minh Mạng established the province of Hanoi in Hoàn Kiếm in 1831.

Between 1954 and 1961, the current district covered all of Hoàn Kiếm ward, Đồng Xuân ward and a part of Hàng Co ward and Hàng Bài ward. In 1961, the entire area was combined into Hoàn Kiếm ward. In January 1981 the ward was upgraded into Hoàn Kiếm district, including 18 wards that have remained since.

Cityscape

The district has a distinctive north–south division among its wards. Its northern-half houses the Old Quarter with small street blocks and alleys, and a traditional Vietnamese atmosphere. Many streets in the Old Quarter have names signifying the goods ("hàng") the local merchants were or are specialized in. For example, "Hàng Bạc" (silver stores) still have many stores specializing in trading silver and jewelries.

Hoàn Kiếm's southern-half has distinctive French-style villas and broad avenues, and is sometimes called the "French Quarter" in modern travel literature. Some notable buildings in Hoàn Kiếm's "French Quarter" are the Hanoi Opera House, the Sofitel Legend Metropole Hanoi hotel, the National Museum of Vietnamese History (formerly the École française d'Extrême-Orient), and the Tonkin Palace. Many of the French-styled buildings in the south of the districts are now used as foreign embassies and government offices. Ba Đình district is also called the "French Quarter" because of the high concentration of French architecture.

Wards

"Old Quarter" area
Cửa Đông (Eastern Gate)
Đồng Xuân (Springfield) 
Hàng Bạc 
Hàng Bồ
Hàng Bông (partially also in the French Quarter)
Hàng Buồm 
Hàng Đào 
Hàng Gai
Hàng Mã
"French Quarter" area
Cửa Nam (Southern Gate)
Hàng Bài
Hàng Trống
Lý Thái Tổ
Phan Chu Trinh
Trần Hưng Đạo
Tràng Tiền (Mint)
Beyond the Red River dike area
Chương Dương
Phúc Tân

Tourist destinations
Many of Hanoi's tourist attractions are located in Hoàn Kiếm, including the Old Quarter, the Hanoi Opera House, the St. Joseph's Cathedral, the National Museum of Vietnamese History, and the Thăng Long Water Puppet Theatre.

References

Districts of Hanoi